Greer Downtown Historic District is a national historic district located at Greer, Greenville County, South Carolina. The district encompasses 40 contributing buildings constructed from ca. 1900 to ca. 1940, with the majority constructed between 1910 and 1930 in the central business district of Greer.  They are largely two-story brick commercial structures.  Notable buildings include the First National Bank of Greer, Planters Savings Bank, R. L. Merchant Building, Bailey Building, Bailes-Collins Department Store, and Davenport Building.

It was listed on the National Register of Historic Places in 1997, with boundary changes approved in 2019.

References

External links

Historic districts on the National Register of Historic Places in South Carolina
Commercial buildings on the National Register of Historic Places in South Carolina
National Register of Historic Places in Greenville County, South Carolina
Historic districts in Greenville County, South Carolina
Greer, South Carolina